The 2012 FIA WTCC Race of China was the penultimate round of the 2012 World Touring Car Championship season and the second running of the FIA WTCC Race of China. It was held on 4 November 2012 at the Shanghai International Circuit in Shanghai, China for the first time, as the previous year's race was held at the nearby Shanghai Tianma Circuit. Both races were won by Chevrolet with Alain Menu winning race one and Robert Huff winning race two.

Background
Following the previous round in Japan, Yvan Muller and Robert Huff were tied at the top of the drivers' championship on 345 points. Norbert Michelisz was leading the Yokohama Independents' Trophy.

Macanese driver Alex Liu joined Liqui Moly Team Engstler to drive their naturally aspirated BMW 320si. Tom Boardman was the only entry for Special Tuning Racing after the team were unable to find a driver for their second car. 2009 British Touring Car Championship champion Colin Turkington returned to the WTCC with Team Aviva-Cofco who were running a Chevrolet Cruze 1.6T. French SEAT León Supercopa driver Hugo Valente would drive for SUNRED Engineering in a SUNRED SR León 1.6T while Fredy Barth returned to the championship to drive a latest specification SEAT León WTCC for SUNRED under the SEAT Swiss Racing by SUNRED banner. Son Veng Racing Team entered a Honda Accord Euro R for Kelvin Leong and Look Fong Racing Team ran a naturally aspirated Chevrolet Cruze LT for Eric Kwong. China Dragon Racing entered a Chevrolet Lacetti for Felipe De Souza and a Chevrolet Cruze LT for Kin Veng Ng.

Report

Free Practice
Alex MacDowall set the fastest time in Friday testing ahead of the works Chevrolet drivers. Turkington set the fifth fastest time on his return to racing, his first time in a front wheel drive car since 2006. Alain Menu could only manage a time that could only get him up to eleventh.

It was Turkington who was quickest in Saturday's first free practice session in the Team Aviva-Cofco Chevrolet Cruze 1.6T, he set the time early and it went unbeaten for the rest of the 30-minute session. Pepe Oriola brought out the red flag two minutes before the end of the session when he stopped his car on the start-finish straight; fellow SEAT driver Fredy Barth was unable to run in the session.

Menu was on top in free practice two in his Chevrolet, the works trio having spent the session swapping fastest times. Independents' leader Michelisz was fifth fastest, Turkington was eighth after topping the first session and Tiago Monteiro was fifteenth in the Honda Racing Team JAS Honda Civic.

Qualifying
Menu claimed his third consecutive pole position of the year, with title rivals Muller second and Huff fourth. Michelisz was the leading independent driver in third. Turkington was fifth on his return to the WTCC, putting ahead of the works Chevrolet trio for race two. A set up change for Gabriele Tarquini in Q2 put him only ninth fastest but with the benefit of a front row start in race two. Barth was 12th on his return, while Monteiro could only manage 17th in the second event for the Honda Civic. James Nash was the quickest of the Team Aon pair in 15th, with teammate Tom Chilton down in 22nd ahead of series debutant Hugo Valente. Liu failed to set a time within the 107% time in his naturally aspirated BMW 320si but was later allowed to race by the stewards.

Warm-Up
Huff led a Chevrolet 1–2–3 in the Sunday morning warm up ahead of Muller and Turkington. Independents' points leader Michelisz was fourth and pole sitter Menu was fifth. Liu beached his BMW 320si in the gravel with five minutes to go.

Race One
Menu completed a lights to flag victory ahead of Huff but teammate and championship leader Muller retired on the first lap with broken rear suspension. The breakage came in a second corner incident which also saw MacDowall, Turkington, Oriola, Darryl O'Young and Tom Coronel involved in a pile up. Michelisz was issued with a drive through penalty on lap five at a time when there was plenty of action in the midfield. Turkington had dropped to the back of the field on the opening lap but by the end of the race had climbed back up to eighth. Second place for Huff and a non-finish for Muller handed Huff the championship lead. After the race, Valente, Nash, Boardman, Monteiro and Barth were issued with 30-second time penalties for missing the chicane to avoid a pileup, dropping the latter three out of the points. Charles Ng picked up his first point of the season as a result.

Race Two
Coronel led away from the start with D'Aste jumping up to second after a slow start for Tarquini. The drivers' door on the Wiechers-Sport car of D'Aste was hanging loose and on the third lap he was an easy target for the Chevrolet trio led by Menu, Coronel was passed a lap later. Turkington was once again fighting back from near the back and he was back up to tenth by lap 6 at the expense of Alberto Cerqui. Menu was leading until the start of lap 8 when Muller out-braked himself and the pair tangled, half-spinning Menu and allowing Huff to pass both of them to take the lead. Muller was second until he was passed by Menu a lap later, the pair swapped places again on lap 11 at the final hairpin. Huff won the race ahead of Muller and Menu with D'Aste the independent winner in sixth. Turkington had climbed up to eighth by the finish. Muller was given a retrospective drive through penalty after the race, dropping him to 13th in the classification.

Results

Qualifying

Bold denotes Pole position for second race.

Race 1

Bold denotes Fastest lap.

Race 2

Bold denotes Fastest lap.

Standings after the round

Drivers' Championship standings

Yokohama Independents' Trophy standings

Manufacturers' Championship standings

 Note: Only the top five positions are included for both sets of drivers' standings.

References 

China
Race of China